Patrick Sapp (born May 11, 1973) is a former linebacker in the National Football League and the XFL.

Biography
Sapp played for the San Diego Chargers and Arizona Cardinals. He played for the San Diego Chargers from 1996–97, and was traded to the Arizona Cardinals along with Eric Metcalf, the Chargers 1st (#3 overall) and 2nd round picks in 1998 and the Chargers 1st round pick in 1999 for the Cardinals 1st round pick in 1998 (#2 overall). The Chargers drafted with that pick Ryan Leaf. Sapp was the starting quarterback for the Clemson Tigers football team, before moving to linebacker.

1973 births
Living people
American football quarterbacks
American football linebackers
Clemson Tigers football players
San Diego Chargers players
Players of American football from Jacksonville, Florida
Arizona Cardinals players
Memphis Maniax players